The 2008 Delray Beach International Tennis Championships was a men's tennis tournament played on outdoor hard courts. It was the 16th edition of the Delray Beach International Tennis Championships, and was part of the International Series of the 2008 ATP Tour. It took place at the Delray Beach Tennis Center in Delray Beach, Florida, United States, from February 11 through February 17, 2008.

The field was headlined by ATP No. 12, 2007 Davis Cup champion and Australian Open quarterfinalist James Blake, 2007 U.S. Open quarterfinalist Tommy Haas, and 2007 Cincinnati Masters quarterfinalist Sam Querrey. Other top seeds competing were 2007 Tokyo quarterfinalist Dudi Sela, Auckland quarterfinalist Florian Mayer, Vincent Spadea, Victor Hănescu and Mardy Fish.

In winning the tournament Kei Nishikori became the first Japanese man in nearly sixteen years to win an ATP Tour event. Shuzo Matsuoka, the last one to do so, against Todd Woodbridge at the 1992 Seoul Open, used to coach Nishikori.

Finals

Singles

 Kei Nishikori defeated  James Blake, 3–6, 6–1, 6–4
It was Kei Nishikori's 1st career singles title.

Doubles

 Max Mirnyi /  Jamie Murray defeated  Bob Bryan /  Mike Bryan, 6–4, 3–6, [10–6]

References

External links
 Official website
 ITF tournament edition details
 Singles draw
 Doubles draw
 Qualifying Singles draw